A number of different spacecraft have been used to carry people to and from outer space.

Table code key

Orbital space vehicles

Suborbital space vehicles

Footnotes

See also
Cargo spacecraft (robotic resupply spacecraft)
Comparison of orbital launch systems
Comparison of orbital rocket engines
Comparison of space station cargo vehicles
Human spaceflight

References

Technological comparisons